The 2013–14 ISU Junior Grand Prix was the 17th season of a series of junior international competitions organized by the International Skating Union. It was the junior-level complement to the 2013–14 ISU Grand Prix of Figure Skating, in which senior-level skaters will compete. Medals were awarded in the disciplines of men's singles, ladies' singles, pair skating, and ice dance.

Skaters earn points toward qualifying for the final at each of the seven Junior Grand Prix events. The top six skaters or teams from each discipline meet at the 2013–14 Junior Grand Prix Final, to be held concurrently with the senior final.

Competitions
The locations of the JGP events change yearly. In the 2013–14 season, the series was composed of the following events in autumn 2013:

Qualifying
Skaters who reach the age of 13 by July 1, 2013 but have not turned 19 (singles and females of the other two disciplines) or 21 (male pair skaters and ice dancers) are eligible to compete on the junior circuit. Unlike the senior Grand Prix, skaters for the JGP are not seeded by the ISU. The number of entries allotted to each ISU member federation is determined by their skaters' placements at the previous season's Junior World Championships in each respective discipline.

Medalists

Men

Ladies

Pairs

†Nagalati / Bobrov were later disqualified from the competition due to a positive doping sample from Nagalati.

Ice dance

Medals table

JGP Final qualification standings

Qualification rules
At each event, skaters earn points toward qualification for the Junior Grand Prix Final. Following the 7th event, the top six highest scoring skaters advance to the Final. The points earned per placement are as follows:

There are seven tie-breakers in cases of a tie in overall points:
 Highest placement at an event. If a skater placed 1st and 3rd, the tiebreaker is the 1st place, and that beats a skater who placed 2nd in both events.
 Highest combined total scores in both events. If a skater earned 200 points at one event and 250 at a second, that skater would win in the second tie-break over a skater who earned 200 points at one event and 150 at another.
 Participated in two events.
 Highest combined scores in the free skating/free dance portion of both events.
 Highest individual score in the free skating/free dance portion from one event.
 Highest combined scores in the short program/short dance of both events.
 Highest number of total participants at the events.
If there is still a tie, it is considered unbreakable and the tied skaters all advance to the Junior Grand Prix Final.

Qualifiers

Top JGP scores
Top scores attained in Junior Grand Prix competitions.

Men

Ladies

Pairs

Ice dance

References

External links
 Standings: Men, Ladies, Pairs, Dance at the International Skating Union
 Official YouTube channel of the International Skating Union
 International Skating Union

ISU Junior Grand Prix
Junior Grand Prix
2013 in youth sport
2014 in youth sport